David H. Carter Jr. (born December 10, 1987) is a former American football defensive end in the National Football League for the Arizona Cardinals and Dallas Cowboys. He was drafted by the Arizona Cardinals in the sixth round of the 2011 NFL Draft. He played college football at UCLA.

Early years
Carter attended Henry J. Kaiser High School in Fontana, California. In his senior season, he registered 69 tackles, 7 sacks and 9 pass deflections in 13 games. He was later named for the first-team All-San Bernardino County by the Riverside Press-Enterprise. He was also an All-League selection as a defensive end, and as team captain, lead them to a 10-3 record as a senior. Carter also lettered in Track And Field and was a member of the schools debate team.

College career
Carter played just three games over his first two years at UCLA, before appearing in all 12 games in the 2008 season. Carter was a co-defensive winner of UCLA's Captain Don Brown Memorial Award for Most Improved Player in 2009 for the Bruins. In his senior season, he recorded 41 Total Tackles while collecting 3.5 sacks for the Bruins which propelled him to win the UCLA Kenneth S. Washington Award for Outstanding Senior.

Professional career
Carter was selected by the Arizona Cardinals in the sixth round of the 2011 NFL Draft. He spent two seasons with the Cardinals, starting just four games and totaling one sack and 17 total tackles.

On September 16, 2013, Carter signed with the Dallas Cowboys, to provide depth because of multiple injuries on the defensive line. He was declared inactive in the third game of the season and played in the next three games. He was released on October 14.

Carter was signed by the Jacksonville Jaguars on August 2, 2014. The Jaguars released Carter on August 24, 2014.

The Chicago Bears signed Carter to a one-year contract on July 28, 2015. On September 5, 2015, he was released by the Bears.

He finished his professional career with 35 games  (4 starts), 30 tackles (4 for loss), one sack, one forced fumble and three pass breakups.

Advocacy
Carter is a vegan activist. He became vegan in 2014 after watching the documentary Forks Over Knives. He advocates for veganism – mainly from a health point of view, but also for animal rights – at speaking engagements and on his website. He and his wife Paige Carter are on the staff of Vegan Outreach.

See also
List of vegans

References

External links

 
 UCLA Bruins football bio

1987 births
Living people
American football defensive tackles
American football defensive ends
American veganism activists
UCLA Bruins football players
Arizona Cardinals players
Dallas Cowboys players
Oakland Raiders players
Jacksonville Jaguars players
Chicago Bears players
Players of American football from Los Angeles